Soehrensia formosa,  is a species of Echinopsis found in South America. In north-western Argentina, Bolivia and northern Chile.
First published in Cactac.: Handb. Kakteenk. 3: 1678 in 1959.

Was once thought to be a species of Echinopsis.

Has 5 Accepted subspecies;
 Soehrensia formosa subsp. formosa
 Soehrensia formosa subsp. kieslingii 
 Soehrensia formosa subsp. korethroides 
 Soehrensia formosa subsp. randallii 
 Soehrensia formosa subsp. rosarioana

References

External links
 
 

Flora of Bolivia
Flora of Northwest Argentina
Flora of northern Chile
formosa